Leucotmemis dorsalis is a moth of the subfamily Arctiinae. It was described by Francis Walker in 1854. It is found in the Amazon region.

References

 

Leucotmemis
Moths described in 1854